Recommended precaution is a fiqh term, prominently used by Shi'a marjas when giving fatwas.  is an action in such a way that includes certain knowledge to original . This term is considered from two views: the first is  view and the other is juridical perspective.

Definition

There are many definitions for recommended precaution in fiqh books and essays.  is observed where the man of jurisprudence does not say anything about fatwa and on the other hand jurists choose the way of imitation freely. Caution concerned primarily with action but  with creating rules.

Types of 

in the Quran

The first group refers to those verses which point to forbidding talking about something without having knowledge.

The second group refers to those verses which point to forbidding the annihilation of human souls.

When Shi'a  give fatwas, they sometimes are not sure about the legality of some issues. In those cases, they recommend that the follower of the  refrain from the act, in case it would indeed be haram. This is in contrast to the general term mustahabb, where people voluntarily do or refrain from doing actions that they know they are not obliged to.

As example:
''It is a recommended precaution that even a child should not be made to sit in the toilet with its face or back facing Qibla. But if the child positions itself that way, it is not obligatory to divert it.

References

Sharia
Islamic jurisprudence
Islamic terminology